De profesión, sospechosos (Professional Suspects) is a 1966 Argentine film.  is a film co-produced between Argentina and Spain directed by Enrique Carreras on the script of Julio Porter.  It was partially filmed in Cordoba, Argentina.

Synopsis 
Two friends suspected by the police of being linked to a crime try to prove their innocence.

Cast
 Pepe Marrone ... Pepe Montes
 Antonio Prieto ... Joaquin Frias
 Graciela Borges ... Laura
 Nathan Finch ... Salustio
 Teresa Serrador ... Dolores
 Tono Andreu ... Santiago
 Dario Vittori ... Mr. Andrade
 Olga Hidalgo ... Mrs. Andrade
 Guido Gorgatti ... Journalist
 Adolfo Garcia Grau ... Stalker
 Ernesto Raquén ... Official
 Juanita Martinez ... Daughter of Andrade
 Hilda Viñas ... Chismosa 2
 Roberto Guthié
 Augusto Bonardo ... Camp TV
 Amalia Bernabé ... Chismosa 1
 Sunday Márquez
 Rafael Diserio
 Alicia Bonnet ... Justina
 Greta Williams
 Enrique San Miguel

External links

References 

1966 films
1960s Spanish-language films
Argentine black-and-white films
1960s Argentine films
Films directed by Enrique Carreras